Bicycle Boy is a 2015 Chinese animated fantasy adventure film directed by Liu Kexin and based on an animated television series of the same name. It was released on January 1. A second film, Bicycle Boy 2, is scheduled for release in China in 2017.

Plot

Voice cast
Tang Xiaoxi
Zhang Xueling
Lu Zhixing

Reception
The film earned  at the Chinese box office.

References

2015 animated films
2015 films
2010s adventure films
2015 fantasy films
Animated adventure films
Chinese animated fantasy films
Animated films based on animated series